Ainārs Linards (born 12 May 1964) is a retired Latvian football midfielder.

References

1964 births
Living people
Soviet footballers
Latvian footballers
FK Liepājas Metalurgs players
FC Daugava players
Örebro SK players
Spårvägens FF players
Association football midfielders
Latvia international footballers
Latvian expatriate footballers
Expatriate footballers in Sweden
Latvian expatriate sportspeople in Sweden